Steven Bayme is an essayist  and author. In 1997 he was National Director of Jewish Communal Affairs at the American Jewish Committee, and holds the rank of Adjunct Professor at the Wurzweiler School of Social Work, Yeshiva University.  Bayme is a graduate of the Maimonides School and of the College of Yeshiva University (1971).

Additionally, Bayme serves on the faculty of the Wexner Heritage Foundation, and has served frequently as a judge for the National Jewish Book Awards. The Jewish-American newspaper The Forward has included him three times on its annual list of top 50 Jewish leaders who "make a difference."

Bayme earned a bachelor's degree in history from Yeshiva University and a doctorate in Jewish history from Columbia University. He has lectured throughout the United States and has taught at Yeshiva University, Jewish Theological Seminary, Hebrew Union College and Queens College. He is a visiting associate professor of history at the Jewish Theological Seminary.

Works
 American Jewry and Judaism in the Twentieth Century, prepared by Steven Bayme & Gary Rubin (1980)
 Poor Among Us: Jewish Tradition and Social Policy''', Steven Bayme (1986)
 Spotlight on the Family: Public Policy and Private Responsibility, Steven Bayme (1988)
 Facing the Future: Essays on Contemporary Jewish Life: In Memory of Yehuda Rosenman, ed. Steven Bayme (1989)
 Rebuilding the Nest: A New Commitment to the American Family, eds. David Blankenhorn, Steven Bayme, & Jean Bethke Elshtain (1990) 
 The Jewish Family and Jewish Continuity, by Steven Bayme & Gladys Rosen (1994) 
 Understanding Jewish History: Texts and Commentary, ed. Steven Bayme (1997) 
 Re-examining Intermarriage: Trends, Textures, and Strategies: Report of a New Study, Bruce A.Phillips, preface by Steven Bayme & David M. Gordis (1997)
 Jewish Arguments and Counter-Arguments: Essays and Addresses'', by Steven Bayme (2002) 
 More available online: Steven Bayme on the Berman Jewish Policy Archive @ NYU Wagner.

External links
Steven Bayme bio at the American Jewish Committee website
 by Steven Bayme

Columbia Graduate School of Arts and Sciences alumni
Hebrew Union College – Jewish Institute of Religion faculty
Historians of Jews and Judaism
Living people
Jewish American writers
Maimonides School alumni
Year of birth missing (living people)
Yeshiva University alumni
21st-century American Jews
American Jewish Committee